Abar Ekla Cholo is a 2016 Bengali television movie directed by Abhijit Guha and Sudeshna Roy. It is the sequel to 2015 film Ekla Cholo. The movie features Saayoni Ghosh and June Malia in the main roles. The film was jointly produced by Zee Bangla Cinema, Abhijit Guha and Sudeshna Roy for Zee Bangla Originals.

Cast
 Saayoni Ghosh as Riya Sen
 June Malia as Ranita
 Koushik Sen as Dr. Subhankar Basu
 Indrajit Mazumder as Rupam
 Abhijit Guha
 Sudeshna Roy

References

External links 
 

Bengali-language Indian films
2010s Bengali-language films
Indian television films
Indian sequel films
Films directed by Abhijit Guha and Sudeshna Roy